Lake Déllő or Lake Dellő was the most significant stillwater in Kecskemét's city center. Now, the place is named after its maker: Gyenes Mihály

References
Joós Ferenc: Barangolások Kecskeméten (Kecskemét, 1968)

Dello